The Brest Challenger is a professional tennis tournament played on hard courts. It is currently part of the ATP Challenger Tour. It is held annually in Brest, France since 2015.

Past finals

Singles

Doubles

References

ATP Challenger Tour
Hard court tennis tournaments
Tennis tournaments in France